John Smith (born 19 April 1933) is a former  Australian rules footballer who played with St Kilda in the Victorian Football League (VFL).

Notes

External links 

Living people
1933 births
Australian rules footballers from Victoria (Australia)
St Kilda Football Club players